Giuseppe Maria Figatelli or Giuseppe Maria da Cento (Casumaro, 11 March 1611 – Mirandola, 20 November 1682) was an Italian mathematician and Capuchin friar.

Not to be confused with the painter Giuseppe Maria Ficatelli from Cento (1639 – 1703).

Works

References

1611 births
1682 deaths
17th-century Italian mathematicians
Capuchins
People from Cento